The 2011 Portuguese presidential election was held on 23 January 2011. This election resulted in the re-election of Aníbal Cavaco Silva to a second term as President of Portugal. Turnout in this election was very low, where only 46.52% of the electorate cast their ballots. Cavaco Silva won by a landslide winning all 18 districts, both Autonomous regions of Azores and Madeira and 292 municipalities of a total of 308.

Procedure
Any Portuguese citizen over 35 years old has the opportunity to run for president. In order to do so it is necessary to gather between 7500 and 15000 signatures and submit them to the Portuguese Constitutional Court.

According to the Portuguese Constitution, to be elected, a candidate needs a simple majority (50% + 1). If no candidate gets this majority there is a second round between the two most voted candidates.

Political context
During the 2006 presidential elections, former Prime Minister Aníbal Cavaco Silva, the only candidate of the center-right had won the ballot in the first round with 50.5% of the votes cast. He had faced two particular candidates from the ruling Socialist Party, the official candidate Mário Soares, former President of the Republic came in third with 14.3%, Manuel Alegre, a dissident, ranked second with 20.7% of votes. This historic victory of a conservative candidate, the first after the Carnation Revolution, inaugurated a period of "political cohabitation" with Socialist Prime Minister José Sócrates.

The general elections of September 2009 confirmed this situation, and brought the PS once again to power, however depriving them of an absolute majority. The situation of economic and financial crisis that the country was facing led to the adoption of an austerity plan and budget for more frequent intervention of the Head of State in politics to promote agreement among political parties in the country.

Candidates

Official candidates
Aníbal Cavaco Silva: President since 2006 and eligible for a second term. Supported by: Social Democratic Party, People's Party,Hope for Portugal Movement
Manuel Alegre: Former member of the Assembly of the Republic. Supported by:Socialist Party,Left Bloc,Portuguese Workers' Communist Party,Democratic Party of the Atlantic
Fernando Nobre: Independent.
Defensor Moura: Member of the Socialist Party and former mayor of Viana do Castelo, running as an independent.
Francisco Lopes: Supported by:Portuguese Communist Party,Ecologist Party "The Greens"
José Manuel Coelho: Independent, supported by the New Democracy Party.

Unsuccessful candidacies

Luís Botelho Ribeiro: Leader of the Pro-life party. His application was formalised on Monday, 20 December, with over 8,000 signatures. His candidacy was analysed by the Constitutional Court. On 29 December, the court concluded that his candidacy did not meet the requirements provided by law.
José Ribeiro e Castro: Member of the Democratic and Social Centre – People´s Party, speculated to run as an alternative right-wing candidate, because of Cavaco's decision to approve same-sex marriage. However, he did not go forward with his candidacy.
José Pinto Coelho: Leader of the far-right National Renovator Party. He declared that his candidacy for the presidency was "cut short" by failing to gather the 7,500 signatures required. He claimed to have gathered 5,878 signatures.

Campaign period

Party slogans

Candidates' debates

Opinion polling

Campaign Budgets

Results

 Summary of the 23 January 2011  Portuguese  presidential  election results
|-
!style="background-color:#E9E9E9;text-align:left;" colspan="2" rowspan="2"|Candidates 
!style="background-color:#E9E9E9;text-align:left;" rowspan="2"|Supporting parties 	
!style="background-color:#E9E9E9;text-align:right;" colspan="2"|First round
|-
!style="background-color:#E9E9E9;text-align:right;"|Votes
!style="background-color:#E9E9E9;text-align:right;"|%
|-
|style="width:10px;background-color:#FF9900;text-align:center;"| 
|style="text-align:left;"|Aníbal Cavaco Silva 
|style="text-align:left;"|Social Democratic Party, People's Party, Hope for Portugal Movement
|style="text-align:right;"|2,231,956
|style="text-align:right;"|52.95
|-
|style="width: 5px" style="background-color:#FF66FF;text-align:center;"|
|style="text-align:left;"|Manuel Alegre
|style="text-align:left;"|Socialist Party, Left Bloc, Portuguese Workers' Communist Party
|style="text-align:right;"|831,838
|style="text-align:right;"|19.74
|-
|style="width: 5px" style="background-color:#777777;text-align:center;"| 
|style="text-align:left;"|Fernando Nobre
|style="text-align:left;"|Independent
|style="text-align:right;"|593,021
|style="text-align:right;"|14.07
|-
|style="width: 5px" style="background-color:red;text-align:center;"| 
|style="text-align:left;"|Francisco Lopes
|style="text-align:left;"|Portuguese Communist Party, Ecologist Party "The Greens"
|style="text-align:right;"|301,017
|style="text-align:right;"|7.14
|-
|style="width: 5px" style="background-color:#1F468B;text-align:center;"|
|style="text-align:left;"|José Manuel Coelho
|style="text-align:left;"|New Democracy Party
|style="text-align:right;"|189,918
|style="text-align:right;"|4.51
|-
|style="width: 5px" style="background-color:#777777;text-align:center;"| 
|style="text-align:left;"|Defensor Moura
|style="text-align:left;"|Independent
|style="text-align:right;"|67,110
|style="text-align:right;"|1.59
|-
|colspan="3" style="text-align:left;background-color:#E9E9E9"|Total valid
|width="65" style="text-align:right;background-color:#E9E9E9"|4,214,860
|width="40" style="text-align:right;background-color:#E9E9E9"|100.00
|-
|style="text-align:right;" colspan="3"|Blank ballots
|width="65" style="text-align:right;"|192,127
|width="40" style="text-align:right;"|4.28
|-
|style="text-align:right;" colspan="3" |Invalid ballots
|width="65" style="text-align:right;"|85,466
|width="40" style="text-align:right;"|1.90
|-
|colspan="3" style="text-align:left;background-color:#E9E9E9"|Total
|width="65" style="text-align:right;background-color:#E9E9E9"|4,492,453
|width="40" style="text-align:right;background-color:#E9E9E9"|
|-
|colspan=3|Registered voters/turnout
||9,657,312||46.52
|-
|colspan=5 style="text-align:left;"|Source: Comissão Nacional de Eleições
|}

Maps

See also
 President of Portugal
 Portugal
 Politics of Portugal

References

External links
Official campaign websites
Aníbal Cavaco Silva official website
Manuel Alegre official website
Fernando Nobre official website
Francisco Lopes official website
Defensor Moura official website
José Manuel Coelho official website
Other websites
Portuguese Electoral Commission
Official results site, Portuguese Justice Ministry
Publication of Polls (ERC)
 NSD: European Election Database - Portugal publishes regional level election data; allows for comparisons of election results, 1990–2010

2011 elections in Portugal
2011
January 2011 events in Europe